Atmakur revenue division is an administrative division in Nandyal district in the Indian state of Andhra Pradesh. It is one of the three revenue divisions in the district and has 10 mandals under its administration.

History
Atmakur revenue division was formed on 4 April 2022 by the Government of Andhra Pradesh along with the newly formed Nandyal district as part of reorganization of the districts in the state.

Administration 
This revenue divisions consist of 10 mandals which are

See also 
List of revenue divisions in Andhra Pradesh
Nandyal revenue division
Dhone revenue division

References

Revenue divisions in Nandyal district